Gera – Greiz – Altenburger Land is an electoral constituency (German: Wahlkreis) represented in the Bundestag. It elects one member via first-past-the-post voting. Under the current constituency numbering system, it is designated as constituency 194. It is located in eastern Thuringia, comprising the city of Gera and the districts of Altenburger Land and Greiz.

Gera – Greiz – Altenburger Land was created for the inaugural 1990 federal election after German reunification. Since 2021, it has been represented by Stephan Brandner of the Alternative for Germany (AfD).

Geography
Gera – Greiz – Altenburger Land is located in eastern Thuringia. As of the 2021 federal election, it comprises the independent city of Gera and the districts of Altenburger Land and Greiz.

History
Gera – Greiz – Altenburger Land was created after German reunification in 1990, then known as Altenburg – Schmölln – Greiz – Gera-Land II. From 2002 through 2013, it was named Greiz – Altenburger Land. It acquired its current name in the 2017 election. In the 1990 through 1998 elections, it was constituency 304 in the numbering system. In the 2002 election, it was number 197. In the 2005 election, it was number 196. In the 2009 and 2013 elections, it was number 195. Since the 2017 election, it has been number 194.

Originally, the constituency comprised the districts of Greiz, Altenburg, Schmölln, and Landkreis Gera. In the 2002 through 2013 elections, it comprised the districts of Greiz and Altenburger Land. It acquired its current borders in the 2017 election.

Members
The constituency was first represented by Harald Kahl of the Christian Democratic Union (CDU) from 1990 to 1998. Peter Friedrich of the Social Democratic Party (SPD) was elected in 1998 and served a single term, followed by fellow SPD member Klaus-Werner Jonas until 2005. Volkmar Vogel was elected in 2005, and re-elected in 2009, 2013, and 2017. Stephan Brandner of the Alternative for Germany (AfD) was elected in 2021.

Election results

2021 election

2017 election

2013 election

2009 election

References

Federal electoral districts in Thuringia
1990 establishments in Germany
Constituencies established in 1990
Gera
Greiz (district)
Altenburger Land